Countess Russell may refer to:

Elizabeth von Arnim (1866–1941), wife of Frank Russell, second Earl Russell
Dora Russell (1894–1986), second wife of philosopher Bertrand Russell
Frances Russell, Countess Russell (1815–1898), second wife of Prime Minister John Russell
Patricia Russell (1910–2004), third wife of philosopher Bertrand Russell

See also
Anne Russell, Countess of Bedford (1615–1684), wife of William Russell, 5th Earl of Bedford
Anne Russell, Countess of Warwick (1548/1549–1604), third wife of Ambrose Dudley, 3rd Earl of Warwick